Brinson Pasichnuk (born November 24, 1997) is a Canadian former professional ice hockey player currently playing senior men's hockey with the Bonnyville Senior Pontiacs of the North Central Hockey League (NCHL) in Alberta, Canada. He previously played for the San Jose Sharks of the National Hockey League (NHL).

Playing career
Born in Bonnyville, Alberta, Pasichnuk played with the Bonnyville Pontiacs in the Alberta Junior Hockey League (AJHL) before spending four seasons with the Arizona State Sun Devils. He signed an entry level contract as a free agent with the Sharks on March 31, 2021.

He made his NHL debut on April 28, 2021, in a 4–2 win over the Arizona Coyotes.

As a free agent following two seasons within the Sharks organization, Pasichnuk paused his professional career in returning to Alberta and playing Senior men's hockey with the Bonnyville Pontiacs of the NCHL for the 2022–23 season.

Career statistics

References

External links

Living people
1997 births
Arizona State Sun Devils men's ice hockey players
Bonnyville Pontiacs players
Canadian expatriate ice hockey players in the United States
Canadian ice hockey defencemen
Ice hockey people from Alberta
People from the Municipal District of Bonnyville No. 87
San Jose Barracuda players
San Jose Sharks players
Undrafted National Hockey League players